Nicholas James Muscarella (born December 1, 1982), known professionally as Nicholas James and additionally variously credited as Nick James or Nicholas J. Muscarella, is an American actor. James is known for his recurring role, since 2016, as Officer Justin Lewis in the television series The Haves and the Have Nots, as well as for appearances in Prom Night (2008) and NCIS: New Orleans (2014). His earliest credited film appearance was in Eating Out 2: Sloppy Seconds in 2006.

James has appeared in television commercials for Grupo Modelo (in 2016) and Walmart (in 2014). Outside of acting, James has also worked as a model.

Early career
Nicholas James's initial interest in performing was directed at comedic rather than dramatic roles, particularly sketch comedy in the style of Saturday Night Live.  In Los Angeles, he studied acting under the tutelage of various renowned figures, including legendary acting coach Vincent Chase (for whom the eponymous fictional character on the TV series Entourage was named). Actor Shia LaBeouf was among his classmates. Later, he attended classes at Upright Citizen's Brigade, thus returning to his earlier interest in improvisational and sketch comedy.

James dropped his surname to form his stage name because, in his own words, “I don't look too Italian and people trip over that name all the time.” His original surname Muscarella has however appeared as part of one of three variations of his name in film and television credits.

Personal life
Nicholas James is originally from Greenville, Pennsylvania, the son of Gregory and Vicki Muscarella; he has an older brother named Michael. He attended Reynolds Junior – Senior High School, and later Penn State Behrend College, studying management and marketing before leaving for Hollywood, where he arrived with just $200 and did bottle service at a bar while pursuing acting. He currently resides in Los Angeles.

James is vocal on political issues via Twitter, and maintains an Instagram account. His interests include the extreme sports skydiving and surfing as well as standup paddleboarding, snorkelling, hiking, animals and exotic teas.

James has been in a relationship with his Haves and the Have Nots co-star Tika Sumpter, since at least 2016. He is reported to be two years her junior, making him 36 in 2018. Their daughter, Ella-Loren, was born October 8, 2016. Despite numerous press outlets stating that James was the father, Sumpter did not confirm his paternity, then she revealed only his first name when announcing that they had become engaged on Christmas Day of 2016.

Filmography
note: credited as Nicholas James, except where indicated

Film

Television

References

External links

Living people
21st-century American male actors
American male soap opera actors
American people of Italian descent
People from Greenville, Pennsylvania
Smeal College of Business alumni
Male actors from Los Angeles
1982 births